Guilty Til Proven Innocent is the only album released by hip hop group, Prime Suspects. It was released on October 6, 1998 through No Limit Records and was produced by the labels production team, Beats By the Pound.

Overview
The album peaked at No. 36 on the Billboard 200 and No. 14 on the Top R&B/Hip-Hop Albums chart, selling 39,000 copies in its first week. Most of the artists signed to No Limit at the time made guest appearances on this album.

Track listing
"All 4 One" – 3:04 (featuring Master P)
"Money Makes..." – 4:07 (featuring Silkk the Shocker & Kane & Abel (group))
"Liquidation of the Ghetto" – 3:53 (featuring Mystikal, O'Dell & Ms. Peaches)
"Mac's and Choppers" – 3:37
"Bust Back" – 4:25
"Ride Wit My Heat" – 2:57
"Of All Da Hustlers" – 4:23 (featuring C-Murder)
"My Old Lady" – 5:11 (featuring Snoop Dogg & Fiend)
"Tweekin'" – 2:10
"Someone Shoulda Told Me" – 3:54 (featuring Mia X)
"We Gots to Do 'Em" – 4:41 (featuring Steady Mobb'n)
"Here I Go Again" – 4:11 (featuring Mr. Serv-On & Mo B. Dick)
"Consequences of the Streets" – 4:12
"Young Niggas" – 4:08
"Soldier 4 Life" – 3:23
"Last Days" – 4:41 (featuring Mac & Lil Rowdy)
"Daily Routine" – 3:50
"Guilty Til Proven Innocent" – 3:41
"Fear" – 3:46
"Children of the Corn" – 4:19 (featuring Ms. Peaches)

References

1998 debut albums
No Limit Records albums
Priority Records albums
Prime Suspects albums